Alice Falaiye (born 24 December 1978) is a Canadian long jumper.

She has won gold medals at the 2003 Pan American Games and the 2010 Commonwealth Games. She also competed at the 2001 World Championships without reaching the final. Falaiye never appeared in the Olympics.

Her personal best jump is 6.72 metres, achieved in June 2009 in Baton Rouge.

References

External links 
 
 
 

1978 births
Living people
Canadian female long jumpers
Pan American Games gold medalists for Canada
Pan American Games medalists in athletics (track and field)
Athletes (track and field) at the 2003 Pan American Games
Medalists at the 2003 Pan American Games
Commonwealth Games gold medallists for Canada
Commonwealth Games medallists in athletics
Athletes (track and field) at the 1998 Commonwealth Games
Athletes (track and field) at the 2010 Commonwealth Games
World Athletics Championships athletes for Canada
Black Canadian female track and field athletes
Medallists at the 2010 Commonwealth Games